Conrad Buff IV (born July 8, 1948) is an American film editor with more than 25 film credits since 1985. Buff is known for winning an Academy Award for Best Film Editing and an ACE Eddie Award for Titanic (1997); the awards were shared with his co-editors James Cameron and Richard A. Harris. He won the 2000 Satellite Award for Best Editing for Thirteen Days.

Life and career
Buff was born in Los Angeles, the son of architect Conrad Buff III, and the grandson of children's book creators Mary and Conrad Buff (painter Conrad Buff II). He attended Eagle Rock High School in Los Angeles.  Pasadena City College for two years before joining the U. S. Navy. Buff learned film editing while working for the Navy's Motion Picture Office in Hollywood. In the first phase of his civilian career Buff was the "visual effects editor" on several successful films, ranging from The Empire Strikes Back (1980) through Ghostbusters (1984). Buff was an assistant editor on Return of the Jedi (1983); he worked with editor Sean Barton and director Richard Marquand. His first editing credit was as the co-editor with Barton for Jagged Edge (1985), which was also directed by Marquand.

Buff is noted particularly for his editing of four films directed by James Cameron, including Titanic. Buff edited The Abyss (1989) with Joel Goodman. Buff was nominated for an Oscar and an Eddie for the editing of Terminator 2: Judgment Day (1991 - with Mark Goldblatt and Richard A. Harris). He was again nominated for an Eddie for True Lies (1994) (also with Goldblatt and Harris). In addition to its actual awards, Titanic was nominated for the BAFTA Award for Best Editing.

Buff has edited four films with director Roger Donaldson: The Getaway (1994), Species (1995), Dante's Peak (1997; co-edited with Tina Hirsch and Howard Smith), and Thirteen Days (2000), which won the Satellite Award for Best Editing.

Since Thirteen Days, Buff has edited seven films directed by Antoine Fuqua: Training Day (2001), Tears of the Sun (2003), King Arthur (2004; with Jamie Pearson), Shooter (2007; with Eric Sears), The Equalizer 2 (2018), Infinite (2021), and Emancipation (2022).

Buff has been elected to membership in the American Cinema Editors.

Filmography
Filmography based on the Internet Movie Database.

References

Further reading
 Mainly an interview with Buff, this article also provides a short biography and a filmography.

External links 
 
 

1948 births
American Cinema Editors
American film editors
Best Film Editing Academy Award winners
Living people
People from Los Angeles